Nikolai Vekšin (in Haapsalu, Governorate of Estonia, Russian Empire – 15 January 1951 in Norillag, Norilsk, Russian SFSR, USSR) was a Russian and Estonian sailor and helmsman of the bronze-medallist Estonian team at the 1928 Amsterdam Olympic Games.

Vekšin graduated from the Karl May School and the Imperator's Petersburg Institute of Technology. He began sailing in 1911 in the Imperial St. Petersburg Yacht Club.

In the 1912 Summer Olympics he was a reserve sailor of the Russian team.

During the Russian Civil War, Vekšin served as an officer in the White Army.

In 1928 he was the helmsman of the Estonian boat Tutti V which won the bronze medal in the 6 metre class; the crew also included William von Wirén, Georg Faehlmann, Andreas Faehlmann and Eberhard Vogdt. It was the only event in the history of the Olympics when five Estonian sportspeople won medals.

After World War II and the Soviet re-occupation of Estonia Vekshin continued yacht racing. He won a silver medal of the USSR championship in 1945. He received his Soviet Master of sports title the same year.

In 1949, Vekšin was arrested by the Soviet authorities. In 1951, he died in the Norillag prison camp in Norilsk, northern Siberia.

References

External links
 
 

1887 births
1951 deaths
Sportspeople from Haapsalu
People from the Governorate of Estonia
Estonian people of Russian descent
Estonian male sailors (sport)
Soviet male sailors (sport)
Olympic sailors of Estonia
Olympic bronze medalists for Estonia
Olympic medalists in sailing
Medalists at the 1928 Summer Olympics
Sailors at the 1928 Summer Olympics – 6 Metre
Saint Petersburg State Institute of Technology alumni
People who died in the Gulag
Norillag detainees